Toomas Voll (born 17 June 1958 in Kilingi-Nõmme) is an Estonian composer, conductor and choir director.

From 1976 to 1979, he studied music pedagogics at Tallinn State Conservatory.

In 1996, he founded Toomas Voll Singing Studio. In 1996, he also founded Leelo National Girls' Choir, and until 2006 being its conductor.

He has conducted at several Estonian Song Festivals.

Awards:
 1995: "Teacher of the Year"
 2008: Order of the White Star, V class

Works

He has written over 50 songs for children and choirs.

References

Living people
1958 births
Estonian conductors (music)
Estonian choral conductors
20th-century Estonian composers
Estonian Academy of Music and Theatre alumni
Recipients of the Order of the White Star, 5th Class
People from Kilingi-Nõmme